The Charles Berryhill House (also known as Black's Gaslight Village) is a historic house located at 414 Brown Street in Iowa City, Iowa.

Description and history 
Charles Berryhill was a Pennsylvania native who moved in Iowa City in 1839. Described as a "merchant, farmer, and speculator," he was a charter member of the local Old Settlers' Association. His house was built over a period of about 15 years. The two-story brick main block is the original portion of the house, built in about 1850. It features a bracketed cornice, decorative window hoods, and columned porches. There are various brick and frame additions that were built onto the back of the house in the succeeding years. There is also a small vernacular stone structure behind the house that is reminiscent of similar structures built in Iowa City in the 1840s and the early 1850s.

The house was individually listed on the National Register of Historic Places on May 31, 1979. In 1994, it was included as a contributing property in the Brown Street Historic District.

References

Houses completed in 1865
Vernacular architecture in Iowa
Houses in Iowa City, Iowa
National Register of Historic Places in Iowa City, Iowa
Houses on the National Register of Historic Places in Iowa
Individually listed contributing properties to historic districts on the National Register in Iowa